Conus beatrix is a species of sea snail, a marine gastropod mollusc in the family Conidae, the cone snails and their allies.

Like all species within the genus Conus, these snails are predatory and venomous. They are capable of "stinging" humans, therefore live ones should be handled carefully or not at all.

Description
The size of the shell varies between 14 mm and 31 mm.

Distribution
This marine species occurs off the Philippines.

References

 Tenorio M.J., Poppe G.T. & Tagaro S.P. (2007) New Indo-Pacific Conidae with taxonomic and nomenclatural notes on Conus recluzianus. Visaya 2(2): 78–90
 Puillandre N., Duda T.F., Meyer C., Olivera B.M. & Bouchet P. (2015). One, four or 100 genera? A new classification of the cone snails. Journal of Molluscan Studies. 81: 1–23

External links
 The Conus Biodiversity website
 Cone Shells – Knights of the Sea
 Gastropods.com: Turriconus beatrix
 Paratype in MNHN, Paris

beatrix
Gastropods described in 2007